Maktoum bin Butti (Arabic مكتوم بن بطي) was the joint founder and first ruler of Dubai, today one of the United Arab Emirates, alongside Obeid bin Said bin Rashid, with whom he led a migration of the Al Bu Falasah from Abu Dhabi, seceding from the Bani Yas. 

He was a signatory to the 1843 Maritime Truce, the precursor to the Perpetual Maritime Truce of 1853, as well as the 1847 treaty to abolish the slave trade.

Migration 
Dubai is thought to have first been established as a fishing village on the Trucial Coast in the early 18th century. It was then a tributary to the Bani Yas tribe of Abu Dhabi.

By 1820, the town was ruled on Sheikh Tahnun bin Shakhbut Al Nahyan's behalf by a regent, when the General Maritime Treaty of 1820 was signed between the sheikhs of the South Eastern Persian Gulf coast and the British. The regent, Saeed bin Saif bin Zaal, signed on behalf of his nephew, Sheikh Mohammed bin Hazza bin Zaal, who was at the time in his minority. Mohammed bin Hazza remained head man of Dubai until the arrival of the Al Bu Falasah in 1833, when he was 23 years of age.

By 1822, it was a town of some 700–800 residents.

The migration of some 800 members of the Al Bu Falasah was triggered by a coup which removed Sheikh Tahnun as Ruler of Abu Dhabi and the Bani Yas tribe. A subsection of the Bani Yas, the Al Bu Falasah disagreed with the actions of the new Ruler, Sheikh Khalifa bin Shakhbut Al Nahyan and moved north to Dubai, which at the time consisted of a settlement of some 250 houses at Shindagha and the Al Fahidi Fort on the other side of the Ghubaiba inlet. The migration would have been an arduous undertaking, and took place over some time throughout and following the pearling season of that year (typically May to November).

Rule 
Having established the Al Bu Falasah in Dubai, Maktoum proceeded to consolidate his position, taking over entirely when Obeid bin Said died of old age in 1836. The settlement expanded, with the natural port in the area near the Al Fahidi Fort providing a wharfage for trading vessels as well as pearling boats. Dubai sat between the rival tribal confederacies of the Bani Yas to the South (Abu Dhabi) and the Al Qassimi to the North (Sharjah and Ras Al Khaimah) and benefited from its location between the two, seeking good relations with the British and building trade.

During this time, the interior of the Trucial Coast was in virtually constant conflict with warring tribes raiding villages and coastal settlements, as well as conflict between coastal communities. In 1843, Maktoum lost an eye in such a conflict with the Ghafalah bedouins.

He also signed, in 1843, the ten-year Maritime Truce, which was to become the model for the Perpetual Maritime Truce of 4 May 1853. The perpetual truce effectively established a British protectorate on the Trucial Coast, but was signed by Maktoum's successor, Saeed bin Butti.

Maktoum also signed the 1847 'Engagement to Prohibit Exportation of Slaves From Africa on board of Vessels Belonging to Bahrain and to the Trucial States and to Allow Right of Search of April–May 1847'.

He died at sea, travelling from Muscat to Qishm, of smallpox in 1852.

See also 
 Al Maktoum
Dubai
History of the United Arab Emirates

References

Maktoum family
Rulers of Dubai
19th-century Arabs
People who died at sea